LDPR — Liberal Democratic Party of Russia is a right-wing populist and ultranationalist political party in Russia. It succeeded the Liberal Democratic Party of the Soviet Union (LDPSU) in Russia after the dissolution of the Soviet Union. The party was led by Vladimir Zhirinovsky since its inception until his death in April 2022. Opposing both communism and neoliberal capitalism of the 1990s, and advocating for monarchism albeit in a constitutional form, the party scored a major success in the 1993 Duma elections with almost 23% of the vote, giving it 64 seats of the 450 seats in the State Duma. In the 2021 elections, the party received 7.55% of the vote, giving it 21 seats.

Despite the party's name, it is frequently described as "neither liberal nor democratic nor a party". The LDPR was centred around Zhirinovsky, and is often described as populist, nationalist, or ultranationalist. It has been described as adhering to statism and authoritarianism, and has also been described as fascist, though this label has been disputed. The party, as part of the "systemic opposition", is considered to be traditionally loyal to the Kremlin. Its members are generally called "zhirinovets" (Russian: жириновец, lit. 'Zhirinovsky's followers').

History

Creation

Liberal Democratic Party of the Soviet Union

An effectively multi-party system emerged in the Soviet Union in the late 1980s in wake of Mikhail Gorbachev's reforms. A formal law for this purpose was introduced in October 1990. In April 1991, the Liberal Democratic Party of the Soviet Union (LDPSU) became the second officially registered political party in the country.

Former KGB General Philipp Bobkov has stated that "in line with Zubatov's ideas," the Central Committee of the Communist Party of the Soviet Union "proposed creating a pseudo-party controlled by the KGB" to direct the interests and sentiments of certain social groups, however he said that he was against the idea. Former Politburo member Alexander Yakovlev described how KGB director Vladimir Kryuchkov proposed the creation of the party with Soviet leader Mikhail Gorbachev at a meeting. He also stated that the Central Committee took over which led to the creation of the Liberal Democratic Party. Yakovlev called the creation of the party a joint effort of the Central Committee and the KGB. In the early 1990s, Mayor of St Petersburg Anatoly Sobchak claimed that party leader Vladimir Zhirinovsky was a "reserve" KGB captain, and a number of key supporters in the LDPR leadership quit the party, accusing Zhirinovsky of KGB ties.

The outspoken leader of the party, Vladimir Zhirinovsky, an effective media performer, gained 8% of votes during the 1991 presidential elections. He also supported the August 1991 coup attempt.

Liberal Democratic Party of Russia
In 1992, the LDPSU broke apart into its regional offsprings and the Liberal Democratic Party of Russia (LDPR) was created as its successor in Russia.

1993–1999 
In the 1993 Duma elections, the pro-reform party supporting President Boris Yeltsin, Russia's Choice, received only 15% of the vote and the new Communist Party of the Russian Federation only 12.4%. The LDPR emerged as the winner with 22.9% of the popular vote. In effect, the Russian population was divided to those who supported Yeltsin's reforms and to those who did not. It is regarded that the popularity of Zhirinovsky and his party arose from the electorate's dissatisfaction with Yeltsin and their desire for a non-communist solution.

Zhirinovsky is credited with having successfully identified the problems of ordinary Russians and offering simple remedies to solve them. For example, he has suggested that all leaders of organized crime should be shot and all Chechens deported from Russia. Zhirinovsky also called for territorial expansion of Russia. Many of Zhirinovsky's views are highly controversial and the LDPR's success in the early 1990s shocked observers both inside and outside Russia.

The Duma elected in 1993 was as interim solution and its mandate expired in 1995. During the two years, Zhirinovsky's popularity waned and his party's support was halved in the 1995 elections (11.2%). The Communists emerged as the winners, with 22.3% of the vote.

In the presidential elections of 1996, the LDPR has nominated Vladimir Zhirinovsky as a candidate. Zhirinovsky gained 5.7% of the votes in the first round.

In 1999, the party participated in the elections as a "Bloc of Zhirinovsky" since the Central Election Commission initially refused to register in the election lists of LDPR, which received 6.0% of the votes. In the 3rd State Duma, Zhirinovsky took up the post of Vice Chairman and the post of the head of fraction occupied by his son Igor Lebedev.

2000–2009 
In the presidential election of 2000, the party has again put forward Vladimir Zhirinovsky, who won 2.7% of votes.

In the parliamentary elections of 2003, the party won 11.5% of the votes and received 36 seats.

In the 2004 presidential election, the LDPR nominated Oleg Malyshkin. The party leader Vladimir Zhirinovsky was hoping to take the post of Prime Minister in case of Malyshkin's victory on elections. In the end, Malyshkin scored 2% of votes, having lost the election.

In the legislative elections in 2007, the LDPR received 5,660,823 votes (8.14%) and received 40 seats in the State Duma.

In the 2008 presidential election, Zhirinovsky was re-nominated as a candidate and scored 9.4% of the vote.

2010–2019 

In the parliamentary elections of 2011, the party scored 11.7% of the vote and won 56 seats. In the 6th State Duma, Vladimir Zhirinovsky returned to the post of head of the LDPR faction and his son Igor Lebedev has held the position of Vice Chairman of the State Duma. In these elections the LDPR gained over one-fifth of votes in Russian Far East (e. g. Primorsky Krai).

In the presidential elections 2012, the party again put forward by Zhirinovsky, whose campaign slogan for 2012 was "Vote Zhirinovsky, or things will get worse". Proshka, a donkey owned by Zhirinovsky, became prominent during the presidential campaign when he was filmed in an election advertisement video. On the last episode of debates with Mikhail Prokhorov just before the elections, Zhirinovsky produced a scandal by calling those Russian celebrities which supported Prokhorov, including a pop-diva and a veteran of Russian pop scene Alla Pugacheva, "prostitutes" ("I thought you are an artful person, politician, cunning man, but you are just a clown and a psycho", replied Pugacheva. "I am what I am. And such is my charm", replied Zhirinovsky). As a result, Zhirinovsky gained 6.2% of the votes.

In the parliamentary elections in 2016, the party improved its result compared to the previous elections. The LDPR surpassed the center-left party A Just Russia, becoming the third largest party in the State Duma. The LDPR won 39 seats, gaining 13.1% of the vote, nearly reaching the second placed Communist Party, which won 13.3% of votes and 42 seats. Also, the party gained single-member constituencies in Russian Far East (notably in Khabarovsk Krai).

In 2015, Zhirinovsky expressed a desire to participate in the presidential elections in 2018. In the past, key figures in the LDPR other than Zhirinovsky had been discussed as potential presidential candidates, such as Zhirinovsky's son Igor Lebedev as well as his close associates Mikhail Degtyarev, Yaroslav Nilov and Alexei Didenko. After the parliamentary elections of 2016, Zhirinovsky said he would run himself.

2020–present
On 9 July 2020, the popular governor of the Khabarovsk Krai and member of the LDPR, Sergei Furgal, who defeated the candidate of Putin's United Russia party in elections two years previously, was arrested and flown to Moscow on charges of involvement in the murders of several businessmen in 2004 and 2005. He denied the allegations. Starting on 11 June, mass protests were held in Khabarovsk Krai in support of Furgal. On 20 July, President Vladimir Putin dismissed Furgal from his position of governor and appointed Moscow-based politician Mikhail Degtyarev, who is also a member of the LDPR, as acting governor. Several regional lawmakers in Khabarovsk opted to leave the LDPR in protest against Furgal's dismissal. The protests included chants of "shame on LDPR", with LDPR loyalists outraged at the party leadership's failure to rally around Furgal.

Zhirinovsky's death

In February 2022, Zhirinovsky was hospitalized in critical condition in Moscow with COVID-19. In March, he was reportedly placed in a medically induced coma, and underwent treatment for COVID-19 complications such as sepsis and respiratory failure. Zhirinovsky claimed to have been vaccinated against COVID-19 eight times.

On 25 March 2022, Zhirinovsky was reported to have died in a hospital. Despite confirmation from several sources, including his own political party, the news was quickly denied by family members. On 6 April 2022, Vyacheslav Volodin, the Speaker of the Duma, announced that Zhirinovsky had died following a long illness. He was 75.

After Zhirinovsky's death, Leonid Slutsky, the head of the State Duma Committee on International Affairs, was elected party leader.

Political positions 

The LDPR seeks "a revival of Russia as a great power". It opposes both communism and neoliberal capitalism. It prefers a mixed economy with private ownership, but with a strong management role reserved for the state. In foreign policy, the party places a strong emphasis on "civilizations". It has supported the restoration of Russia with its "natural borders" (which the party believes include Transcaucasia, Central Asia, Belarus and Ukraine). The LDPR regards the United States and NATO as Russia's main external threats. The party has harshly criticised the discrimination against ethnic Russians in the Baltic states and demanded that they should be given Russian citizenship and protected against discriminatory legislation. The LDPR is also against corruption and enlargement of the European Union, identifying as a Eurosceptic party, instead preferring pan-Slavism. Professor Henry E. Hale lists the party's main policy stands as nationalism and a focus in law and order. Although it often uses radical opposition rhetoric, the LDPR frequently votes for government proposals. This has led to speculation that the party receives funding from the Kremlin. Political parties in Russia that had broken the 3% voting barrier and entered the parliament (State Duma) are officially financed by government, according to federal law. As such, all opposition parties in the State Duma are largely funded by the federal budget (e. g. in 2018, LDPR received 99.7% of its funding from the government, CPRF 90%, and A Just Russia 81%).

Zhirinovsky has stated that he wants to see a monarch titled "supreme ruler" lead Russia and had promised to shoot his political opponents if elected president.

Structure and membership 

The party's organization was almost entirely centered on its former leader Vladimir Zhirinovsky, who died on 6 April 2022.

The party is in alliance with several parties in the former Soviet republics, including Armenia, Belarus, Estonia and Ukraine.

In 2003, the party claimed 600,000 members and had issued 475,000 party cards. According to a 2008 survey by Colton, Hale and McFaul, 4% of the Russian population are loyalists of the party.

Electoral results

Presidential

State Duma

See also 

 Liberal Democratic Party of Belarus
 Liberal Democratic Party of Pridnestrovie
 List of Liberal Democratic Party of Russia deputies in the State Duma
 Miflaga Mitkademet Liberalit Demokratit

References

External links 
 
 Official Website 
 Political Program LDPR
 Zhirinovsky's 2007 political manifesto 
 Non-official Website 

 
Political parties established in 1992
1992 establishments in Russia
Nationalist parties in Russia
Russian nationalist parties
Organizations that oppose LGBT rights
Right-wing populist parties
Right-wing populism in Asia
Right-wing populism in Russia
Anti-communist parties
Anti-communist organizations in Russia
Eurosceptic parties in Russia
Social conservative parties
Far-right political parties in Russia
Conservative parties in Russia
Monarchist parties in Russia
Registered political parties in Russia
Right-wing parties in Europe
Right-wing politics in Asia
Anti-Americanism
Anti-Ukrainian sentiment in Russia